The Civic Restaurants Act 1947 is a British law.

During World War II, British Restaurants had been set up to feed civilians in need. As rationing continued after the war, many continued to operate, and the Civic Restaurants Act of 1947 enabled those that were still profitable to remain open as Civic Restaurants. In 1949, 678 Civic Restaurants existed in the United Kingdom.

The Labour Minister of Food, John Strachey, noted that "private enterprise in the catering trade has, on the whole and by and large, catered for the middle class and not for the working class." Civic Restaurants differed little in general from British Restaurants. The Civic Restaurants Act gave them the option of applying to the local licensing authority in order to serve alcohol on the premises. This was opposed by temperance campaigners in particular, but defended for breaking down the social barriers between the “tea drinker” and the “beer drinker”.

Many Civic Restaurants remained in place well into the 1950s, being used for meals, teas and functions such as wedding receptions. The last rationing ended in 1954 and by this time, few Civic Restaurants remained.

References

United Kingdom Acts of Parliament 1947